Eddy Polo in the Wasp's Nest (German: Eddy Polo im Wespennest) is a 1928 German silent action film directed by Léo Lasko and starring Eddie Polo, Grit Haid and Heddy Waldow.

The film's sets were designed by the art director Karl Görge.

Cast
 Eddie Polo as Eddy Polo 
 Grit Haid as Ellinor van der Straaten 
 Heddy Waldow as Sigrid, ihre Freundin 
 Alfred Krafft-Lortzing as Fritz Clarens 
 Nico Turoff as Athletenkarl 
 Steffi Lorée as Nelly, seine Schwester 
 Max Maximilian as Stummelmaxe 
 Aruth Wartan as Nebenpaule 
 Harry Nestor as Kavalierharry 
 Bruno Ziener as Diener bei Clarens

References

Bibliography
 Alfred Krautz. International directory of cinematographers, set- and costume designers in film, Volume 4. Saur, 1984.

External links

1928 films
1920s action films
German action films
Films of the Weimar Republic
German silent feature films
Films directed by Léo Lasko
German black-and-white films
1920s German films